The Harlow PC-5 was a 1930s American military trainer version of the PJC-2, and was designed and built by the Harlow Aircraft Company.

Development

The Harlow Aircraft Company in Alhambra, California, designed a version of the PJC-2 as a tandem two-seat training aircraft. The PC-5 had a revised fuselage with dual controls. The aircraft first flew in July 1939 but it failed to interest the United States Army Air Corps. Howard Hughes' business partner, J.B. Alexander, backed the project and had flown in early examples of the aircraft. Harlow licensed the manufacturing rights to the PC-5 to Cub Aircraft of Canada during the wartime buildup. Only five aircraft had been built when the company was taken over by the Intercontinent Corporation. Components for 50 aircraft were supplied to the Indian company Hindustan Aeronautics, who were to assemble the aircraft for use by the Royal Indian Air Force as the PC-5A. The first PC-5A flew in August 1941, but it is not known how many were assembled and flown.

Using an engineering team brought in by Intercontinental, a cheaper version of the PC-5 was developed and built as the PC-6. The PC-6 wing failed, causing a fatal accident during an early test flight.

Variants
PJC-5 later PC-5
Tandem two-seat training version of the PJC-2
PC-5A
Version for assembly in India by Hindustan Aircraft, number built not known.
PC-6
Cheaper version of the PC-5, one built.

Operators
 
 Royal Indian Air Force

Specifications (PC-5A)

See also

References

Further reading
 
 

PC-05
1930s United States military trainer aircraft
Single-engined tractor aircraft
Low-wing aircraft
Aircraft first flown in 1939